Chaudhry – The Martyr is a 2022 Pakistani biographical action film. The film features Tariq Islam, Shamoon Abbasi, Arbaaz Khan, and Zara Abid in lead roles. Chaudhry - The Martyr is directed by Azeem Sajjad. This film is based on the life of Chaudhry Aslam Khan.

Cast 
 Tariq Islam as Chaudhry Aslam Khan 
 Shamoon Abbasi
 Arbaaz Khan
 Asfar Mani
 Adnan Shah Tipu
 Nawal Saeed as Zoya
 Zara Abid
 Jia Ali

Production 
In 2019 it was announced that an action movie based on his life will be released, Chaudhry - The Martyr, directed by Azeem Sajjad. Chaudhry's role will be played by his cousin Chaudhry Tariq Islam, who hails from the same villages, is a DSP himself, and worked with Khan for over thirty years; the director acknowledged he had cast him because he's "well versed with [Khan's] body language, gestures, attitude and reflexes."

Release
After multiple delays due to COVID-19 pandemic, it was officially announced that the film would be released on 24 June 2022.

See also 
 Cinema of Pakistan
 Lollywood

References 

Urdu-language Pakistani films
Pakistani action films
Lollywood films
Unreleased Pakistani films
Upcoming films